HD 200964 is a 7th magnitude star located approximately 237 light-years away in the constellation of Equuleus. It is a K-type subgiant with 44% more mass than the Sun, but cooler. At the age of 3 billion years, it indicates that it is an evolved A-type star. At a magnitude of 6.64, this star is too faint to be seen with the naked eye for most people, but binoculars would make it easy to see this star. Only people with a very clear eyesight and very dark sky can barely see this star.

The star is known to have two giant extrasolar planets.

Planetary system
On July 26, 2010 the California and Carnegie Planet Search team announced the discovery of two planets around HD 200964 along with two planets around 24 Sextantis. The inner planet is nearly twice as massive as Jupiter and takes 614 days to orbit the star in a circular orbit at the average distance of 1.60 AU (240 Gm). The outer planet is 9/10 the mass of Jupiter and takes 825 days to orbit eccentrically around the star at the average distance of 1.95 AU (292 Gm).

Due to the close proximity of the two planets to each other the discoverers only found stable orbits near the 4:3 resonance, meaning that every time the outer planet orbits the star three times, the inner planet orbits the star four times. The two planets are separated by only 0.35 AU. Because of the small separation between the two massive planets, the gravitational tugs between the two planets is nearly 3 million times greater than the gravitational force between Earth and Mars, 700 times larger than that between Earth and the Moon, and 4 times larger than the pull of the Sun on Earth. After additional radial velocity measurements were taken stable solutions in the 7:5 and 3:2 mean-motion resonances were found in addition to the  4:3 mean-motion resonance. The 7:5 configuration currently provides the best match to the measurements.

There is evidence of a possible third planet in the system with a period of ~7 days however the three planet model of the system is only slightly better than the two planet model.

See also
 24 Sextantis
 List of extrasolar planets

References

200964
104202
Equuleus
K-type subgiants
Planetary systems with two confirmed planets
Equulei, 10
Durchmusterung objects